Touching Down is the first solo studio album by the drum and bass DJ Roni Size. It was released in 2002 by Full Cycle Records.

Critical reception
CMJ New Music Monthly wrote that while "Size still rocks harder than most junglists, he rarely vaults over the genre's limitations here." Billboard called it a "fluid set that moves from track to track with little or no delineation."

Track listing

References

2002 debut albums
Roni Size albums